Newwiela Point (Maltese: Ras in-newwiela) is a geographical cape located on the southern coast of Gozo, the second largest island of Malta. It is the southernmost point of the whole island. It is commonly known as one of the largest dive sites in the island with its average depth being around 30 meters. The cape is largely flat but is surrounding with a steep drop-off. Two caves may also be found within the surrounding cliffs.

References

Gozo
Landforms of Malta
Extreme points of Malta